The United Nations General Assembly Fifth Committee (also known as the Administrative and Budgetary Committee or C5) is one of six main committees at the United Nations General Assembly. It deals with internal United Nations administrative and budgetary matters.

Mandate 
The Fifth Committee deals with: Member State contributions to the regular and peacekeeping budgets of the organisation, how Member State contributions are allocated, the programme and peacekeeping budgets of the United Nations and human resources issues. It also is responsible for administrative matters, such as: management reform, governance, oversight and accountability issues. Finally, it is responsible for examining all draft resolutions with budget implications before they can head to the Plenary.

Working Methods  
The work of the Fifth Committee is split into three sessions:
 A main session lasting from September to December.
 A resumed session in March in which any items not concluded in the main part of the session are considered.
 A second resumed session in May in which the administrative and budgetary aspects of United Nations Peacekeeping are considered.

The work of the Committee begins when reports are introduced in formal meetings, which are followed by discussion in informal meetings. Following these meetings, draft resolutions are created and discussed in informal consultations. There are two readings per draft resolution. If consensus cannot be reached, the resolution is not passed by the Committee. However, if there is consensus, the draft resolution is first adopted informally, then tabled by the Chair and, finally, formally adopted by the Committee. The Committee rarely formally votes as most resolutions are adopted by consensus.

As all draft resolutions with budget implications must be examined by the Committee, it is usually the last committee to complete its work, usually in mid- to late-December.

Reporting Bodies 
The following bodies report through the Fourth Committee to the General Assembly:
 Advisory Committee on Administrative and Budgetary Questions  (ACABQ)
 Board of Auditors
 Committee on Conferences
 Committee on Contributions
 Committee on Programme Coordination (CPC)
 Independent Audit Advisory Committee (IAAC)
 International Civil Service Commission (ICSC)
 Joint Inspection Unit (JIU)

Current state 
In its 75th Session, the Committee will focus on:

 Organizational, administrative and other matters
 Appointments to fill vacancies in subsidiary organs and other appointments
 Revitalization of the work of the General Assembly
 Financial reports and audited financial statements, and reports of the Board of Auditors
 Review of the efficiency of the administrative and financial functioning of the United Nations
 Programme budget for 2020
 Proposed programme budget for 2021
 Programme planning
 Improving the financial situation of the United Nations
 Pattern of conferences
 Scale of assessments for the apportionment of the expenses of the United Nations
 Human resources management
 Joint Inspection Unit
 United Nations common system
 United Nations pension system
 Administrative and budgetary coordination of the United Nations with the specialized agencies and the International Atomic Energy Agency
 Report on the activities of the Office of Internal Oversight Services
 Administration of justice at the United Nations
 Financing of the International Residual Mechanism for Criminal Tribunals
 Administrative and budgetary aspects of the financing of the United Nations peacekeeping operations
 Financing of the United Nations Interim Security Force for Abyei
 Financing of the United Nations Multidimensional Integrated Stabilization Mission in the Central African Republic
 Financing of the United Nations Operation in Côte d’Ivoire
 Financing of the United Nations Peacekeeping Force in Cyprus
 Financing of the United Nations Organization Stabilization Mission in the Democratic Republic of the Congo
 Financing of the United Nations Mission in East Timor
 Financing of the United Nations Stabilization Mission in Haiti
 Financing of the United Nations Mission for Justice Support in Haiti
 Financing of the United Nations Interim Administration Mission in Kosovo
 Financing of the United Nations Mission in Liberia
 Financing of the United Nations Multidimensional Integrated Stabilization Mission in Mali
 Financing of the United Nations peacekeeping forces in the Middle East
 Financing of the United Nations Mission in South Sudan
 Financing of the United Nations Mission for the Referendum in Western Sahara
 Financing of the African Union-United Nations Hybrid Operation in Darfur
 Financing of the activities arising from Security Council resolution 1863 (2009)

Bureau 
The following make up the bureau of the Fifth Committee for the 75th Session of the General Assembly:

See also
 United Nations General Assembly First Committee
 United Nations General Assembly Second Committee
 United Nations General Assembly Third Committee
 United Nations General Assembly Fourth Committee
 United Nations General Assembly Sixth Committee

References

External links
 United Nations Fifth Committee

5